The 1967–68 season was the 53rd in the history of the Isthmian League, an English football competition.

Enfield were champions, winning their first Isthmian League title.

League table

References

Isthmian League seasons
I